Gravity is a song by Maaya Sakamoto that is sung in the English language. An abridged version (omitting the opening, middle section and ending) is played as the closing theme of Wolf's Rain. It is also renditioned in her 15th Memorial Live "Gift" concert.

Single track listing
"Gravity"
 (Shimashima does not have any real translation, although shima on its own can mean "stripe" or "island".)

Charts

See also
 Maaya Sakamoto

References

Maaya Sakamoto songs
Anime songs
2003 songs
Songs written by Yoko Kanno